The 2020–21 season was the 53rd season in the existence of Elche CF and the club's first season back in the top flight of Spanish football. In addition to the domestic league, Elche participated in this season's edition of the Copa del Rey. The season covered the period from 24 August 2020 to 30 June 2021, with the late start to the season due to the COVID-19 pandemic in Spain.

Players

First-team squad

Reserve team

Out on loan

Transfers

In

Out

Pre-season and friendlies

Competitions

Overall record

La Liga

League table

Results summary

Results by round

Matches
The league fixtures were announced on 31 August 2020.

Copa del Rey

Statistics

Goalscorers

Notes

References

External links

Elche CF seasons
Elche